Franklinville is the name of several places in the United States of America:

Franklinville, Georgia
Franklinville, New Jersey 
Franklinville (town), New York
Franklinville (village), New York
Franklinville, North Carolina
Franklinville, Philadelphia, a neighborhood in Philadelphia, Pennsylvania